Saul Nassé (born 1965) is a former television producer for the BBC, former chief executive of Cambridge Assessment, and a fellow of Robinson College, Cambridge. At the BBC he was successively Editor of Tomorrow's World, general manager of BBC Worldwide Productions in Mumbai and Controller of BBC Learning.

Early life
Saul Nassé was born in 1965 and educated at Bedford Modern School between 1974 and 1983. At the age of seven his interest in science was inspired by Raymond Baxter, the first presenter of Tomorrow's World on the BBC. After school he read Natural Sciences at the University of Cambridge where he earned a Master of Arts. Thereafter, he spent three years as a research student at Cranfield University before ending his PhD to join the BBC in 1990.

Career
Nassé joined the BBC Science Department where he worked on factual programming. In 1997, following in the footsteps of Raymond Baxter who had inspired his interest in science, Nassé was made editor of Tomorrow's World, the youngest person to have held that position during the programme's near forty-year history. He also oversaw the launch of its website, one of the first websites that the BBC created.

In 2001, Nassé was made Editor, Youth at the BBC World Service Trust. During this time he produced a successful reality television show in India, Haath Se Haath Milaa, designed to increase awareness of AIDS. In 2004, he was made the BBC's Acting Head of Religion and Ethics producing programmes across all media and including coverage of the death of Pope John Paul II.

In 2007, Nassé became general manager of BBC Worldwide Productions in Mumbai. During this time he produced the Indian versions of Strictly Come Dancing and Baby Borrowers.

Nassé was appointed Controller of BBC Learning in 2010, responsible for all the BBC's formal learning content including Bitesize, the free online educational support service for children. He was also charged with leading the move of BBC Learning to its new offices in Salford. During this time he was responsible for the BBC Domesday Reloaded project and for the BBC's role in creating the Your Paintings website, a project with Art UK to exhibit online the United Kingdom's entire collection of publicly owned oil paintings. An avid fan of Doctor Who, he was also the inspiration behind Death Is the Only Answer in 2011 and the online learning product iWonder.

In 2014, Nassé left the BBC and was appointed Chief executive of Cambridge Assessment English. On his appointment, Nassé commented: ‘Digital is transforming the way people learn, making it a really exciting time to lead Cambridge English’. In 2018 he was promoted to become Group Chief Executive of Cambridge Assessment, where he served until 2021.

Family life
Nassé was a Governor of the University of Sunderland and a Trustee of the Teaching Awards Trust. He is married with a daughter.

References

1965 births
Living people
English television producers
English educational theorists
BBC executives
Alumni of the University of Cambridge
People educated at Bedford Modern School
Fellows of Robinson College, Cambridge